Magnesium oxide (MgO), or magnesia, is a white hygroscopic solid mineral that occurs naturally as periclase and is a source of magnesium (see also oxide). It has an empirical formula of MgO and consists of a lattice of Mg2+ ions and O2− ions held together by ionic bonding. Magnesium hydroxide forms in the presence of water (MgO + H2O → Mg(OH)2), but it can be reversed by heating it to remove moisture.

Magnesium oxide was historically known as magnesia alba (literally, the white mineral from Magnesia), to differentiate it from magnesia negra, a black mineral containing what is now known as manganese.

Related oxides
While "magnesium oxide" normally refers to MgO, the compound magnesium peroxide MgO2 is also known. According to evolutionary crystal structure prediction, MgO2 is thermodynamically stable at pressures above 116 GPa (gigapascals), and a semiconducting suboxide Mg3O2 is thermodynamically stable above 500 GPa. Because of its stability, MgO is used as a model system for investigating vibrational properties of crystals.

Electric properties 
Pure MgO is not conductive and has a high resistance to electric current at room temperature. The pure powder of MgO has a relative permittivity inbetween 3.2 to 9.9  with an approximate dielectric loss of tan(δ) > 2.16x103 at 1kHz.

Production
Magnesium oxide is produced by the calcination of magnesium carbonate or magnesium hydroxide.  The latter is obtained by the treatment of magnesium chloride  solutions, typically seawater, with limewater or milk of lime.
Mg2+  + Ca(OH)2  →  Mg(OH)2  +  Ca2+
Calcining at different temperatures produces magnesium oxide of different reactivity. High temperatures 1500 – 2000 °C diminish the available surface area and produces dead-burned (often called dead burnt) magnesia, an unreactive form used as a refractory. Calcining temperatures 1000 – 1500 °C produce hard-burned magnesia, which has limited reactivity and calcining at lower temperature, (700–1000 °C) produces light-burned magnesia, a reactive form, also known as caustic calcined magnesia.  Although some decomposition of the carbonate to oxide occurs at temperatures below 700 °C, the resulting materials appear to reabsorb carbon dioxide from the air.

Applications

Heating elements 
MgO is prized as a refractory material, i.e. a solid that is physically and chemically stable at high temperatures. It has two useful attributes: high thermal conductivity and low electrical conductivity. Filling the spiral Calrod range top heating elements on kitchen electric stoves is a major use. "By far the largest consumer of magnesia worldwide is the refractory industry, which consumed about 56% of the magnesia in the United States in 2004, the remaining 44% being used in agricultural, chemical, construction, environmental, and other industrial applications." MgO is used as a basic refractory material for crucibles.

Fireproofing 
It is a principal fireproofing ingredient in construction materials. As a construction material, magnesium oxide wallboards have several attractive characteristics: fire resistance, termite resistance, moisture resistance, mold and mildew resistance, and strength.

Gas mantles 
Most gas mantles utilize magnesium oxide.  Early iterations such as the Clamond basket used only this.  Later versions use ~60% magnesium oxide, with other components such as lanthanum oxide or yttrium oxide making up the rest.  Another exception would be thoriated gas mantles.

Niche uses 
MgO is one of the components in Portland cement in dry process plants.

Magnesium oxide is used extensively in the soil and groundwater remediation, wastewater treatment, drinking water treatment, air emissions treatment, and waste treatment industries for its acid buffering capacity and related effectiveness in stabilizing dissolved heavy metal species.

Many heavy metals species, such as lead and cadmium are most soluble in water at acidic pH (below 6) as well as high pH (above 11). Solubility of metals affects bioavailability of the species and mobility soil and groundwater systems. Most metal species are toxic to humans at certain concentrations, therefore it is imperative to minimize metal bioavailability and mobility.

Granular MgO is often blended into metals-contaminated soil or waste material, which is also commonly of a low pH (acidic), in order to drive the pH into the 8–10 range where most metals are at their lowest solubilities (basic).  Metal-hydroxide complexes have a tendency to precipitate out of aqueous solution in the pH range of 8–10. MgO is widely regarded as the most effective metals stabilization compound when compared to Portland cement, lime, kiln dust products, power generation waste products, and various proprietary products due to MgO's superior buffering capacity, cost effectiveness, and ease/safety of handling.

Most, if not all products that are marketed as metals stabilization technologies create very high pH conditions in aquifers whereas MgO creates an ideal aquifer condition with a pH of 8–10.  Additionally, magnesium, an essential element to most biological systems, is provided to soil and groundwater microbial populations during MgO-assisted metals remediation as an added benefit.

Medical
Magnesium oxide is used for relief of heartburn and indigestion, as an antacid, magnesium supplement, and as a short-term laxative. It is also used to improve symptoms of indigestion. Side effects of magnesium oxide may include nausea and cramping. In quantities sufficient to obtain a laxative effect, side effects of long-term use may rarely cause enteroliths to form, resulting in bowel obstruction.

Other

 As a food additive, it is used as an anticaking agent. It is known to the US Food and Drug Administration for cacao products; canned peas; and frozen dessert. It has an E number of E530.
 It was historically used as a reference white color in colorimetry, owing to its good diffusing and reflectivity properties. It may be smoked onto the surface of an opaque material to form an integrating sphere.
 It is used extensively as an electrical insulator in tubular construction heating elements. There are several mesh sizes available and most commonly used ones are 40 and 80 mesh per the American Foundry Society. The extensive use is due to its high dielectric strength and average thermal conductivity. MgO is usually crushed and compacted with minimal airgaps or voids. The electrical heating industry also experimented with aluminium oxide, but it is not used anymore.
 As a reagent in the installation of the carboxybenzyl (Cbz) group using benzyl chloroformate in EtOAc for the N-protection of amines and amides.
 It is also used as an insulator in heat-resistant electrical cable.
 MgO doping has been shown to effectively inhibit grain growth in ceramics and improve their fracture toughness by transforming the mechanism of crack growth at nanoscale. 

 Pressed MgO is used as an optical material. It is transparent from 0.3 to 7 μm. The refractive index is 1.72 at 1 μm and the Abbe number is 53.58. It is sometimes known by the Eastman Kodak trademarked name Irtran-5, although this designation is obsolete. Crystalline pure MgO is available commercially and has a small use in infrared optics.
 MgO is packed in bags around transuranic waste in the disposal cells (panels) at the Waste Isolation Pilot Plant, as a  getter to minimize the complexation of uranium and other actinides by carbonate ions and so to limit the solubility of radionuclides. The use of MgO is preferred to this of CaO as the resulting hydration product is less soluble and releases less hydration heat. Another advantage is to impose a lower pH value of ~ 10.5 in case of accidental water ingress in the dry salt layers while the more soluble  would create a higher pH of 12.5 (strongly alkaline conditions). The  cation being the second most abundant cation in seawater and in rocksalt, the potential release of magnesium ions dissolving in brines intruding the deep geological repository is also expected to minimize the geochemical perturbations.
 MgO has an important place as a commercial plant fertilizer and as animal feed.
 An aerosolized solution of MgO is used in library science and collections management for the deacidification of at-risk paper items. In this process, the alkalinity of MgO (and similar compounds) neutralizes the relatively high acidity characteristic of low-quality paper, thus slowing the rate of deterioration.
 MgO is also used as a protective coating in plasma displays.
 Magnesium oxide is used as an oxide barrier in spin-tunneling devices. Owing to the crystalline structure of its thin films, which can be deposited by magnetron sputtering, for example, it shows characteristics superior to those of the commonly used amorphous Al2O3. In particular, spin polarization of about 85% has been achieved with MgO versus 40–60 % with aluminium oxide. The value of tunnel magnetoresistance is also significantly higher for MgO (600% at room temperature and 1,100 % at 4.2 K) than Al2O3 (ca. 70% at room temperature).

Precautions
Inhalation of magnesium oxide fumes can cause metal fume fever.

See also

Notes

References

External links
Data page at UCL
Ceramic data page at NIST
NIOSH Pocket Guide to Chemical Hazards at CDC

Magnesium minerals
Magnesium compounds
Oxides
Refractory materials
Optical materials
Ceramic materials
Antacids
E-number additives
Rock salt crystal structure